The Roman Catholic Diocese of Petrópolis is a diocese located in the city of Petrópolis in the Ecclesiastical province of Niterói in Brazil.

History
 April 13, 1946: Established as Diocese of Petrópolis from the Diocese of Barra do Piraí and Diocese of Niterói.

Bishops
 Bishops of Petrópolis (Roman rite):
Manuel Pedro da Cunha Cintra † (3 January 1948 - 15 February 1984) Retired
José Fernandes Veloso † (15 February 1984 - 15 November 1995) Retired
José Carlos de Lima Vaz, S.J. † (15 November 1995 - 12 May 2004) Retired
Filippo Santoro (12 May 2004 - 21 November 2011) Appointed, Archbishop of Taranto
Gregório (Leozírio) Paixão Neto, O.S.B. (10 October 2012 – present)

Coadjutor bishop
José Fernandes Veloso (1981-1984)

Auxiliary bishop
José Fernandes Veloso (1966-1981), appointed Coadjutor here

Other priests of this diocese who became bishops
Paulo Francisco Machado, appointed Auxiliary Bishop of Juiz de Fora, Minas Gerais in 2004
Gilson Andrade da Silva, appointed Auxiliary Bishop of São Salvador da Bahia in 2011

References
 GCatholic.org
 Catholic Hierarchy
 Diocese website (Portuguese)

Roman Catholic dioceses in Brazil
Christian organizations established in 1946
Petropolis, Roman Catholic Diocese of
Roman Catholic dioceses and prelatures established in the 20th century